Antonio Gianettini (also Giannettini, Zanettini, Zannettini; 1648 – 12 July 1721) was an Italian organist, concertmaster and composer.

Biography 
Born in Fano, almost nothing is known about Gianettini's musical training; in 1662, sources place him in Venice, where he probably studied under the guidance of Sebastian Enno. On 14 January 1674 he was admitted as a bass singer in the choir of the chapel of the Basilica of San Marco. Subsequently, on 5 December 1676 he was appointed as an organist at the Basilica of Santi Giovanni e Paolo with a salary of 40 ducats a year (a position he held until 1679). In this period he studied music with Carlo Grossi and perhaps also with Giovanni Legrenzi. On 25 January 1677 he was also an organist at San Marco (while being a choir singer). From 1676 he started to be active as a composer: in this period he wrote about ten works in Venice and Milan and various sacred music (including some motets for Ippolito Bentivoglio). During years 1685-1686 he was also active as a composer and a capella teacher for the Duke of Hannover Ernesto Augusto of Brunswick-Lüneburg. While there, he stayed in a building overlooking the Grand Canal.

On May 1, 1686, Gianettini left his offices at San Marco to take the place of maestro di cappella at the court of Francesco II, Duke of Modena. His salary for his services to the court of Modena was 396 lire a month (a considerable amount for the time). For the Duke's court he wrote 9 oratorios, but also other sacred compositions, cantatas and serenades. With the outbreak of the Spanish succession war, Modena was occupied by the French and in 1702 he had to flee with Duke Rinaldo I (successor of Francesco II) to Bologna. After the war, in 1707 he returned to Modena, where he continued his work as the director of the chapel, but without receiving the high salary like years before. In 1710, he was part of the teaching faculty for the virtuosos of Modena, giving lessons to singers such as the Tenor Francesco Maria Cignoni. In May 1721 he decided to accompany her daughter Maria Caterina to Munich, a city where she was active as a singer at the Bavarian court and where he died shortly after.

Although rarely known now, Gianettini was considered as one of the most talented composers of his era. He was very much appreciated as an opera and composer of sacred music both in Italy and in Germany.

Bibliography 
Antonio Gianettini, in Dizionario biografico degli italiani, Rome, Institute of the Italian Encyclopedia.

Works 
Gianettini created oratorios, of which La morte di Cristo is the best known, as well as about 20 stage works, cantatas, masses and other sacred music.

Oratorios

 Amore alle catene, oratorio di S Antonio;  Modena, 1687 
 Jefte; Text, Giovanni Battista Neri; Modena, 1687; Music lost
 L’uomo in bivio; Modena, 1687
 La creatione de’ magistrati; Modena, 1688 
 La conversione della beata Margherita di Cortona;  Modena, 1689; Music lost
 Il martirio di S Giustina; Modena,  1689; Music lost
 La vittima d’amore ossia La morte di Cristo;  Modena, 1690
 Dio sul Sinai; Modena, 1691; Music lost
 Le finezze della divina grazia nella conversione di S Agostino; Modena, 1697; Music lost

Stage works

 Medea in Atene; Libretto: Aurelio Aureli; Venice, December 14, 1675
 L’Aurora in Atene; Libretto: G. Frisari; Venice, S. S. Giovanni e Paolo, 1678
 Echo ravvivata; festive music, 3 acts; Venice, 1681
 Irene e Costantino; Venice, San Salvatore, 1681
 Temistocle in bando; Libretto: Antonio Morselli; Venice, San Cassiano, December 4, 1682
 L’Ermione riacquistata; Libretto: F. Pazzaglia; Venice, Palace of the Prince Alessandro Farnese, March 29, 1683; Music lost
 Il giuditio di Paride; trattenimento da camera, 1 act; Venice, June 1685
 La Fedeltà consolata dalla Speranza; Libretto: Nicolò Beregan, Serenata; Venice, August 1685
 Amor sincero; Libretto: N. Beregan, Serenade; Venice, July 1686
 L’ingresso alla gioventù di Claudio Nerone; Libretto: G.B. Neri; Modena, Fontanelli, November 4, 1692
 Introduzione alla festa d’armi e balli; Libretto: E. Pinamonte Bonacossi; Modena, 1699; Music lost
 Tito Manlio; Libretto: Matteo Noris, comedies; Reggio Emilia, 1701
 Virginio consolo; Libretto: M. Noris; Venice, San Angelo, 1704; Music lost
 Artaserse; Libretto: Apostolo Zeno and Pietro Pariati; Venice, San Angelo, 1705;
 I presagi di Melissa; Libretto: F. Torti, introduction to a dance party; Modena, 1709; Music lost
 Publio Scipione, ossia Il riparatore delle glorie romane; accademico tributo; Modena, July 1710; Music lost
 L’unione delle tre dee Pallade, Giunone e Venere; Libretto, G.M. Tommasi, Serenade; Modena, 1716; Music lost
 La gara di Minerva e Marte; Modena, 1716; Music lost
 Il Panaro in giubilo; Libretto: G.M. Tommasi, Serenade; Modena, 1717; Music lost

Selected recordings
Antonio Giannettini: l'Uomo in Bivio - Oratorio, Modena 1687 Cantar Lontano, Marco Mencoboni 2CD 2021 GCD923524 Glossa

References 

17th-century Italian composers
18th-century Italian composers
17th-century composers
18th-century composers
Italian male composers
Italian organists
18th-century keyboardists
Concertmasters
Male classical violinists
1648 births
1721 deaths
People from Fano
17th-century male musicians